Star Line Mackinac Island Ferry Service is a ferry boat company serving Mackinac Island in Michigan. The company has a dock at Mackinaw City and two at St. Ignace.

History
Star Line Mackinac Island Ferry Service was started by Tom Pfeiffelmann, Sam McIntire, and others in the late 1970s. The company started off previously as Argosy Boat Line. The company was named Star Line after the 5 original stockholders making up a 5 pointed star. In 1979 Star Line brought their first fast ferry, M/.V Marquette, to the Island. When Arnold Transit Company introduced their catamaran M/V Island Express in 1987, Star Line responded with M/V Radisson, an 85-foot fast ferry which was modeled after a luxury yacht. She boasted two propellers as the other ferries had, but also had twin hydro-jets for added speed. One hydro pointed out of the water making an incredible plume of water behind the boat. In time the M/V La Salleadded hydro-jets. In 1990 Star Line added Cadillac and in 1993 added Joliet. These boats were built in the style of the M/V Radisson.' In 2005 the Star Line added M/V Marquette II.

In November, 2016, Star Line purchased the majority of competitor Arnold Transit Company's assets, assuming the almost 140 years of its history and combining it with that of Star Line's existing fleet.  

This acquisition made Star Line, Mackinac Island's oldest and largest ferry fleet.

Star Line also operates a pleasure cruise on Friday and Saturday evenings from Mackinaw City and St. Ignace respectively during the summer months.

In 2019 Star Line added the "M/V Good Fortune" pirate ship and offers trips to Mackinac Island as well as daily cruises aboard it during the summer months.

Fleet
Star Line has the largest fast ferry fleet in Michigan with six hydro-jet ferries: M/V La Salle, M/V Radisson, M/V Cadillac, M/V Joliet, and M/V Marquette II.  They also own classic ferries M/V Anna May, some of the former Arnold Transit Company classic ferries M/V Huron, M/V Ottawa, Chippewa, M/V Straits of Mackinac II, M/V Mackinac Express a high-speed water-jet–powered catamaran ferry service passenger service and the only pirate ship on the currently on the Great Lakes "M/V Good Fortune".

References

External links
 Official Website

Ferry companies of Michigan
Mackinac Island
Transportation in Cheboygan County, Michigan
Transportation in Mackinac County, Michigan
Transportation companies of the United States